Ann Lewis Cooper (April 10, 1934 - January 22, 2020 ) was an American commercial pilot, flight instructor and inductee of the Women in Aviation International Pioneer Hall of Fame in 2004. She was best known as an author who wrote over 700 magazine articles, edited aviation publications and published several biographies about flying.

Cooper was born in Baldwin, New York and was the youngest of three children. She graduated from Connecticut College for Women with a sociology degree. In 1969 while at a cocktail party while married to Storris Warinner, she heard about a lieutenant's wife getting her pilot's license. She went on to get her license in August 1969 and had over 2000 flying hours. She worked as a flight instructor at Southern Oregon Aviation. During her lifetime she received her commercial rating, ground instructor advanced ratings and glider rating. She served as a designated safety advisor and was a test administrator for the Federal Aviation Administration.

Writing 
She wrote biographies about women in aviation including: Rising Above It, Edna Gardner Whyte (1991); Fire and Air, A Life on the Edge (1995); How High She Flies (1998) and Stars of the Sky (2008). She collaborated with her husband Charles on many other books including one on Tuskegee Airman Roy LaGrone called Tuskegee's Heroes (1995), on War in Pacific Skies (2003) and Into the Sunlit Splendor (2005).

Recognition 
In 2004 she was inducted into the Women in Aviation Pioneer Hall of Fame. In 2010 she was named the Women in Aviation International Volunteer. In 2016 she was inducted into the Greene County Women's Hall of Fame.

Family 
Cooper was first married to Storris Warinner and they divorced after 21 years of marriage. She was then married to Charles Cooper for 14 years before her death.

References 

American women aviators